This list of amphibians of Florida includes species native to or documented in the U.S. state of Florida.

Amphibians

Tongueless frogs (Pipidae)
 African clawed frog - introduced

Tree frogs (Hylidae) 
 Pine Barrens tree frog
 American green tree frog
 Barking tree frog
 Squirrel tree frog
 Ornate chorus frog
 Northern cricket frog
 Southern chorus frog
 Southern cricket frog
 Upland chorus frog
 Pine woods tree frog
 Cope's gray tree frog
 Spring peeper
 Bird-voiced tree frog
 Gray tree frog
 Little grass frog

True frogs (Ranidae) 
 American bullfrog
 Bronze frog
 Carpenter frog
 Florida bog frog
 Gopher frog
 Pig frog
 Rana clamitans - locally called "green frog"
 River frog
 Southern leopard frog

Rain frogs (Eleutherodactylidae) 
 Greenhouse frog - introduced

True toads (Bufonidae) 
 Southern toad
 Fowler's toad
 Oak toad
 Cane toad - introduced/invasive

American spadefoot toads (Scaphiopodidae) 
 Eastern spadefoot

Narrow-mouthed frogs (Microhylidae) 
 Eastern narrow-mouthed toad

True salamanders and newts (Salamandridae) 
 Eastern newt
 Striped newt

Sirens (Sirenidae) 
 Lesser siren

Amphiuma (Amphiumidae) 
 One-toed amphiuma

Mole salamanders (Ambystomatidae) 
 Frosted flatwoods salamander
 Reticulated flatwoods salamander
 Marbled salamander
 Mole salamander
 Eastern tiger salamander

Lungless salamanders (Plethodontidae) 
 Southeastern slimy salamander
 Three-lined salamander
 Apalachicola dusky salamander
 Southern dusky salamander
 Seal salamander
 Many-lined salamander
 Four-toed salamander
 Southern red salamander
 Rusty mud salamander
 Dwarf salamander
 Georgia blind salamander

See also
List of birds of Florida
List of mammals of Florida
List of reptiles of Florida
List of fishes of Florida
Fauna of Florida

References

 Frogs

External links
Florida amphibians
UF Wildlife Treefrogs
Florida Frogs and Toads
Salamanders
nas.er.usgs.gov

amphibians
Florida